Anyaa-Sowutuom may refer to:
Anyaa-Sowutuom (Ghana parliamentary constituency)
Sowutuom, also known as Anyaa-Sowutuom, town in Greater Accra Region, Ghana